There are at least 76 features in the US named Dollar Lake, according to GNIS: